Damirchi-ye Sofla (also Romanized as Damīrchī-ye Soflá; also known as Damīrchelū-ye Soflá and Damīrchī-ye Pā’īn) is a village in Ojarud-e Sharqi Rural District, Muran District, Germi County, Ardabil Province, Iran. At the 2006 census, its population was 390, in 72 families.

References 

Towns and villages in Germi County